QUV may refer to:
 ISO 639:quv, the ISO 639-3 code for the Sakapultek language
 Aappilattoq Heliport (Kujalleq), the IATA code QUV